The 2010 Major League Soccer All-Star Game, held on July 28, 2010, was the 15th annual Major League Soccer All-Star Game, a soccer match involving all-stars from Major League Soccer. The MLS All-Stars faced Manchester United of the English Premier League in the seventh All-Star Game that featured the league's best players facing international competition. The match was broadcast in the US on ESPN2 in English and Galavision in Spanish.

Manchester United thrashed the MLS All-Stars 5–2 to become the first international club to defeat the All-Stars in regulation time (fellow Premier League side Everton won the 2009 All-Star Game on penalties). United forward Federico Macheda, who scored the game's first two goals, was named Most Valuable Player.

Houston Dynamo and MLS announced Reliant Stadium as the venue on September 8, 2009. MLS Commissioner Don Garber speculated the league might have drawn a team from Mexico to play the MLS All-Stars in 2010, given the close proximity of the country to Houston.

Host venue
MLS Commissioner Don Garber announced on July 27, 2009 that Houston had been chosen as the host city for the upcoming 2010 MLS All-Star Game, in a press conference at the Canyons Resort in Park City, Utah during All-Star Week festivities. The 2010 MLS All-Star game was the first to be played in the state of Texas.

MLS All-Stars voting
Like the previous year, the selection of the MLS All-Star First XI was determined by an online fan voting system that accounted for 25% of the total vote, with players, coaches and general managers, and the media each holding 25% of the vote. The fan voting period was announced after the start of the 2010 Major League Soccer season. An additional seven players were chosen by the MLS All-Star head coach Bruce Arena and the Commissioner of MLS Don Garber.

Inactive Roster
In addition to the 25-man roster of players available to participate in the match, MLS also announced 7 additional inactive all-stars: goalkeepers Jimmy Nielsen (Kansas City) and Kasey Keller (Seattle), midfielders Joel Lindpere (New York), Robbie Rogers (Columbus), Freddie Ljungberg (Seattle), and forwards Fredy Montero (Seattle) and Conor Casey (Colorado).

2010 MLS All-Star Game Rosters

Major League Soccer
The 2010 MLS All-Star First XI was announced on Tuesday, July 13, 2010, but midfielder Kyle Beckerman was forced to withdraw from the squad due to injury. A further 13 players were added to the roster on July 19.

Players in bold denotes First XI status.

Manchester United
Manchester United announced their squad on July 9, 2010.

Match details

References

2010
Manchester United F.C. matches
Sports competitions in Houston
Soccer in Houston
All-Star Game
2010 in sports in Texas
2010 in Houston
July 2010 sports events in the United States